United Group for Publishing Advertising and Marketing (UG) also known as United Group (Syria) or United Group (UG), is the largest private sector media group in the Syria.

Overview 
Regarded as the media arm of the Assad regime in various Arab countries, United Group (UG) publishes the government-aligned Baladna newspaper in Syria, and published the defunct Al-Balad newspaper in Lebanon, Kuwait, and the Comoros. Baladna is one of two private daily newspapers covering political topics that have succeeded in staying open after the Syrian civil war, due to close ties to the Syrian government.

Ownership 
The company is publicly listed on the Damascus Securities Exchange and majority owned by Majid Bahjat Suleiman, Bachar Kiwan, and their relatives.

References 

Mass media companies of Syria
Companies of Syria